Noarlunga Centre is a suburb in the City of Onkaparinga in the southern suburbs of Adelaide, South Australia. The suburb is mostly commercial, being dominated by the Centro Colonnades shopping centre and the small 'Inspire Noarlunga' estate to the east of Goldsmith Road. The suburb is bordered by Beach Road to the north, Dyson Road to the west Goldsmith Road to the south and the Southern Expressway to the east. Burgess Drive, Seaman Road and David Witton Drive are the main thoroughfares inside the boundaries of the suburb.

The name Noarlunga is an English adaptation of the native Kaurna word Nurlongga, meaning 'at the curvature', referring to the horseshoe bend near the mouth of the Onkaparinga River.

Sharing the name Noarlunga are the two adjacent seaside suburbs Port Noarlunga and Port Noarlunga South and the historic township of Old Noarlunga that is located on the Onkaparinga River.

Port Noarlunga was the original town centre prior to Noarlunga Centre being constructed.

Noarlunga English adaptation of the kaurna name has also been spelt as Nglungga.

Facilities
Noarlunga Centre is home of many facilities. The Onkaparinga Council headquarters, Noarlunga TAFE, the Hopgood Theatre, the Noarlunga Library and Noarlunga Hospital are all located in this area, as well as a 5 screen Wallis Cinema, a bowling alley, an ice-skating rink, a swimming centre, 24-hour BodySmith fitness centre, as well as a multi-sport venue. The number of retailers in this area is large, with over 200 residing in Centro Colonnades, as well as a few on Dyson Road, and a number in the area just behind this.
Health :
Noarlunga Centre is also home to the Noarlunga Hospital, a 108-bed regional health service. Noarlunga Hospital was established in 1985 as a regional community health service.

Transport

In Noarlunga Centre, just near Colonnades Shopping Centre, is Noarlunga Centre railway station, providing numerous bus links to anywhere in the metro area, and a train station, to get to Adelaide by rail. The Southern Expressway also has an on/off ramp located in Noarlunga. The expressway was recently widened.

City buses from the station interchange and centro colonnades are routes:
721, T721, 722, T722, 723.

Climate

Noarlunga Centre experiences a hot-summer mediterranean climate (Köppen: Csa, Trewartha: Csal); with warm to hot, dry summers; mild to warm, relatively dry springs and autumns; and mild, relatively wet winters.

See also
Noarlunga (disambiguation)
History of Adelaide
European settlement of South Australia

References

Suburbs of Adelaide